The 2d Space Wing was a wing of the United States Air Force. Constituted on 5 December 1984 and activated on 8 July 1985, it was the host wing at Falcon Air Force Station (later Falcon Air Force Base; now Schriever Air Force Base). It took operational control of the Air Force Satellite Control Network in October 1987. It was inactivated on 30 January 1992 when the 50th Space Wing replaced it.

Assignments

Major command
Air Force Space Command (5 December 1984 – 30 January 1992)

Numbered air force
14th Air Force (5 December 1984 – 30 January 1992)

Components

Groups
 2d Satellite Tracking Group (1 October 1987 – 30 January 1992)
 1000th Satellite Operations Group (1 April 1986 – 30 January 1992)
 1002d Space Support Group (1 October 1989 – 30 January 1992)
 1879th Communications Group (1 October 1990 – 30 January 1992)

Squadrons
 1st Manned Spaceflight Control Squadron (1 December 1985 – 30 June 1989)
 1st Satellite Control Squadron (5 October 1987 – 30 January 1992)
 2d Special Security Squadron (15 August 1985 – 15 October 1986)
 3d Satellite Control Squadron (2 February 1990 – 30 January 1992)
 1002d Special Security Squadron (15 October 1986 – 14 November 1986)
 1002d Space Systems Support Squadron (later, 1002d Space Systems Squadron) (1 October 1985 – 30 January 1992)
 1022d Combat Crew Training Squadron (1 June 1990 – 30 January 1992)

Bases stationed
Falcon Air Force Station (later Base, now Schriever Air Force Base), Colorado (5 December 1984 – 30 January 1992)

Decorations
Air Force Outstanding Unit Award 
 1 December 87  – 30 November 89
 1 September 89  – 31 August 91

Commanders
 Col. Richard Griffin, 8 July 1985 – 8 July 1986
 Brig. Gen. Lester Weber, 8 July 1986 – 12 December 1988
 Brig. Gen. Jimmy Morrell, 12 December 1988 – 27 August 1990
 Col. Roger DeKok, 27 August 1990 – 30 January 1992

Emblem

Blazon
Azure, within a pattern of seven mullets argent a globe celeste gridlined of the first, encompassed by an orbital ring bendsinisterwise argent bearing two polestars or, overall a flight symbol bendwise argent emitting a contrail or, all within a diminished bordure of the last.

Significance
Blue and yellow are the Air Force colors.  Blue alludes to the sky, the primary theater of operations for the Air Force.  Yellow refers to the sun and excellence required of Air Force personnel.  The globe represents the earth as viewed from space and signifies the worldwide coverage provided by Air Force satellite in accomplishing surveillance and communications missions.  The ellipse symbolizes the Air Force Satellite Control Network and the two stars depict the satellites.  The deltoid and its contrail denote the Air Force Launch Vehicles that place the satellites in orbit.  The seven stars represent the vastness of space and the environment of our operations.

References

See also
 1st Space Wing
 3d Space Wing

Military units and formations in Colorado
0002
Military units and formations established in 1984